College Road may refer to:

 A2212 road in London, England
 College Road, Hong Kong, Kowloon City, Hong Kong
 College Road drill hall, Hanley, former military installation at College Road (formerly Victoria Road) in Hanley, Stoke-on-Trent, Staffordshire.
 College Road Trip, 2008 American family comedy film.
 North Carolina Highway 132, known as College Road in Wilmington, North Carolina

Odonyms referring to a building